Number 17 Squadron (sometimes written as No. XVII Squadron), currently No. 17 Test and Evaluation Squadron (TES), is a squadron of the Royal Air Force. It was reformed on 12 April 2013 at Edwards Air Force Base, California, as the Operational Evaluation Unit (OEU) for the Lockheed Martin F-35B Lightning.

History

First World War

No. 17 Squadron formed for the first time on 1 February 1915 at Gosport as part of the Royal Flying Corps (RFC). It was first equipped with the Royal Aircraft Factory B.E.2c. After an initial training period, the Squadron embarked for Egypt in November and arrived on 11 December. On 24 December, the Squadron made its first reconnaissance flight over the Turkish lines in Sinai, also flying in support of troops engaged with Turkish army units in the Western Desert. Detachments were also to be found in Arabia until July 1916, when the Squadron was sent to Salonika as a mixed unit of twelve B.E.2cs for reconnaissance and a scout component of two Airco D.H.2s and three Bristol Scouts. At first it was the only RFC unit in Macedonia but was later joined by others in April 1918, handing over its fighters to a newly formed No. 150 Squadron. For the rest of the war, it was engaged in tactical reconnaissance and artillery spotting on the Bulgarian border.

Interwar years
In December 1918, the Squadron re-equipped with twelve Airco D.H.9s and six Sopwith Camels, sending 'A Flight' to Batum to support the White Russian forces and 'B' and 'C Flights' to Constantinople in January 1919. On 14 November 1919, No. 17 Squadron was disbanded.

The Squadron reformed at RAF Hawkinge on 1 April 1924 and was equipped with Sopwith Snipes. From this time No. 17 Squadron formed part of the fighter defence of the UK until the outbreak of the Second World War. The Squadron converted to the Hawker Woodcock in March 1926, one of only two squadrons to operate it - the other being No. 3 Squadron. In June 1927 a Woodcock from No. 17 Squadron was borrowed by the pilot of the Spirit of St. Louis, Charles Lindbergh, who flew it from London to Paris shortly after his transatlantic flight. In January 1928, the Squadron converted over to the Gloster Gamecock, these were only kept until September when they were exchanged for Armstrong Whitworth Siskins.

No. 17 Squadron then equipped with Bristol Bulldog Mk.IIs in October 1929, these would be kept up until August 1936. However, during the Abyssinian Crisis in 1935, the Squadron lost most of its Bulldogs as reinforcements for other squadrons moving to the Middle East and so had to fly Hawker Harts for a period. No. 17 Squadron were equipped with Gloster Gauntlets in August 1936. It was in recognition of these aircraft that the Squadron got its badge design, which was officially approved by Edward VIII in October 1936. The Squadron received its first monoplane, the Hawker Hurricane Mk.I, in June 1939.

Second World War
No. 17 Squadron flew defensive patrols from numerous bases in Britain, including RAF Debden and RAF Martlesham Heath, until the German attack on France in May 1940. Once the Phony War was over, fighter sweeps were then flown over the Netherlands, Belgium and French airfields to cover the retreat of allied troops. In June 1940, the Squadron moved to Brittany as the remnants of BEF and RAF units in France were evacuated, retiring to the Channel Islands for two days before returning to the UK. No. 17 Squadron flew over southern England throughout the Battle of Britain. The Squadron briefly upgraded to Hurricane Mk.IIas in February 1941 however they shortly reverted to Hurricane Mk.Is in April.  No. 17 Squadron moved up to RAF Castletown in northern Scotland on 5 April for rest. In July 1941 the Squadron again upgraded its Hurricanes, this time to Mk.IIbs.

On 11 November 1941, the Squadron sailed for the Far East where war broke out on 7 December. Diverted to Burma, it arrived in January 1942, as Japanese troops neared Rangoon. Defensive patrols were flown until the Rangoon airfields were overrun and No. 17 Squadron moved north, eventually being cut off from India while operating from Lashio. The surviving aircraft were flown out and the ground personnel made their way across Burma to the Indian border. By the end of May, the Squadron had re-assembled at Calcutta and in June received aircraft again for the defence of the area. In August 1942, No. 17 Squadron upgraded to Hurricane Mk.IIcs. Ground attack missions began in February 1943 and continued until August, when the Squadron moved to Ceylon. Supermarine Spitfire Mk.VIIIs began to arrive in March 1944 and were taken back to the Burma front in November to fly escort and ground attack missions. In June 1945, No. 17 Squadron upgraded to Spitfire Mk.XIVes. The Squadron was withdrawn from Burma to prepare for the invasion of Malaya. However, due to the atomic bombings of Hiroshima and Nagasaki, they were simply taken by the carrier  to the landing beaches near Penang in early September, soon after the Japanese capitulation.

Post-War

Cold War

In April 1946, No. 17 Squadron arrived in Japan to form part of the British Commonwealth Occupation Force. The squadron remained here until it disbanded on 23 February 1948. However it shortly returned to existence on 11 February 1949 at RAF Chivenor when No. 691 Squadron was renumbered as No. 17 Squadron. The Squadron adopted No. 691 Squadron's role of being an anti-aircraft co-operation unit. During this time the Squadron flew a mixture of aircraft including the Spitfire LF.XVIe and target tugs: Airspeed Oxford T.II; Miles Martinet TT.I; North American Harvard TT.IIb; Bristol Beaufighter TT.X. No. 17 Squadron continued this role until it disbanded once again on 13 March 1951.

The Squadron reformed at RAF Wahn in West Germany on 1 June 1956. This time it operated English Electric Canberra PR.7s, thus carrying out the photo reconnaissance role. The Squadron moved to RAF Wildenrath in April 1957 and flew from here before standing down on 31 December 1969. It stood up once more on 1 September 1970 at RAF Brüggen, this time flying the new McDonnell Douglas Phantom FGR.2, in a ground attack role. They were also assigned to SACEUR from which the Phantoms held a tactical nuclear strike role, carrying American supplied nuclear weapons. In September 1975, the Squadron began to convert over to the SEPECAT Jaguar GR.1.

No. 17 Squadron were fully re-equipped with twelve Jaguar GR.1s by 31 January 1976. These continued the nuclear strike role from the Phantoms, being assigned to SACEUR, but this time carrying the British WE.177 nuclear weapon, a role they kept until 1984. Their task was to support land forces in a high-intensity European war using conventional weapons initially, and tactical nuclear weapons if a conflict escalated. Some aircraft were to be held back in reserve from the conventional phase to ensure that sufficient aircraft survived the conventional phase to deliver the squadron's full stock of eight nuclear weapons.

Still at RAF Brüggen, No. 17 Squadron began to convert to the Panavia Tornado GR.1 in January 1985. They reached full strength of twelve aircraft by 1 March when the last Jaguars were disbanded. The Squadron at this time also had eighteen WE.177 nuclear bombs, and although the squadron's role remained unchanged, their Tornado aircraft were each able to carry two WE.177 bombs, with the ratio of weapons to aircraft at full strength increasing to 1.5 : 1.

Operation Granby

During the First Gulf War in 1991, No. 17 Squadron engineers were deployed to Muharraq Airfield in Bahrain, and also had crews sent to Dhahran Airfield. At Muharraq, its twelve Tornado GR.1s were split between three flight lines – 'Snoopy AirWays', 'Triffid Airways' and 'Gulf Airways'. Tornado operations, as part of Op GRANBY, began on 17 January 1991 to assert air superiority over Iraq. The Squadron suffered a loss on 24 January when a Tornado GR.1 (ZA403) was rocked by an explosion forcing the pilot (Fg. Off. S. J. Burgess) and navigator (Sqn Ldr R. Ankerson) to eject. Both crew members were captured and were kept as prisoners of war (PoWs) until the end of conflict. An investigation after the war of the wreckage and flight recorder deduced that one of the 1,000lb bombs dropped had detonated prematurely thus causing extensive damage to the Tornado. No. 17 Squadron suffered its second loss on 14 February when a Tornado GR.1 (ZD717) carrying out laser-guided bomb attacks on an Iraqi airfield was forced down by two Iraqi SAMs which exploded in close proximity to the aircraft. The pilot (Flt. Lt. R. J. Clark) initiated ejection for himself and his navigator (Flt. Lt. S. M. Hicks). On landing Clark was captured by Iraqi forces and was held as a PoW for the rest of the war, it was only after his capture that he learned his navigator Hicks had been killed in the attack.

Tornados to Typhoons
Returning to RAF Brüggen, No. 17 Squadron continued its nuclear strike role up until the retirement of the WE.177, with it finally relinquishing its nuclear delivery capability fully in 1998. With the end of the Cold War and the reunification of Germany, the RAF planned to reduce its presence in Germany by half, and by 1996 a final decision was made to withdraw the entire RAF presence from the country. Due to the Strategic Defence Review of 1998, it was decided to withdraw two RAF squadrons, one of which was No. 17 Squadron. The Squadron and its Tornado GR.1s disbanded on 31 March 1999, ending almost 30 years at RAF Brüggen.

The Squadron was reformed on 1 September 2002 as No. XVII (Reserve) Squadron at BAE Systems's Warton Aerodrome. At Warton, a special facility had been constructed to specially operate the new Eurofighter Typhoon T.1s and F.2s. No. 17 (R) Squadron was tasked with being the Operational Evaluation Unit (OEU), or alternatively the Typhoon Operational Evaluation Unit (TOEU), for the type, becoming the first in the RAF to operate it. The Squadron relocated to RAF Coningsby on 1 April 2005 and was officially re-formed at its new base on 19 May 2005. With the Typhoon fully operational, the need for the separate OEU ended and so the Squadron was disbanded on 12 April 2013. Its functions were taken over by the RAF's Test and Evaluation Squadron, No. 41 (R) Squadron.

Modern day

F-35B Lightning

The Squadron stood up at Edwards AFB, California, on 12 April 2013 as a joint RAF/Royal Navy Test and Evaluation Squadron for the new Lockheed Martin F-35B Lightning. In January 2014, it became the first UK, and RAF, squadron to operate the F-35B Lightning, with BK-1 (ZM135) being the first British aircraft. In February 2015, the Squadron celebrated its centenary at Edwards AFB. No. 17 (R) Squadron is currently made up of half RAF/RN personnel, as well as training personnel for No. 617 Squadron and No. 207 Squadron; the second and third RAF squadrons to operate the F-35B in 2018 and 2019. Equipped with 3 F-35B aircraft (ZM135, ZM136 and ZM138), it continues to be the first UK Lightning squadron and is tasked with full-time operational test and evaluation of the F-35B, required to bring the aircraft and its weapons into UK service. It operates within the Joint Operational Test Team for F-35 at Edwards AFB, flying operational test sorties alongside all variants from the US Air Force, US Navy, US Marine Corps and Royal Netherlands Air Force, as part of the UK Partnership within the F-35 program. It's currently embedded with the 461st Flight Test Squadron of the United States Air Force. No. 17 (Reserve) Test and Evaluation Squadron lost its (Reserve) suffix on 1 February 2018 when the (Reserve) nameplate was rescinded across the entire RAF, thus becoming No. 17 Test and Evaluation Squadron.

No. 17 TES embarked their three F-35Bs upon  on 13 October 2019 as part of Westlant 19, becoming the first British jets to land on the carrier.

Aircraft operated

 Royal Aircraft Factory B.E.2c (Feb 1915–Nov 1915)
 Royal Aircraft Factory B.E.2c (Dec 1915–June 1918)
 Bristol Scout (July 1916–Sep 1916)
 Airco D.H.2 (July 1916–Sep 1916)
 Royal Aircraft Factory B.E.12a (Nov 1916–Sep 1918)
 SPAD S.VII (July 1917–Apr 1918)
 Nieuport 17 (Aug 1917–Dec 1917)
 Royal Aircraft Factory S.E.5a (Dec 1917–Apr 1918)
 Armstrong Whitworth F.K.8 (Mar 1918–Dec 1918)
 Airco D.H.9 (Dec 1918–Nov 1919)
 Sopwith Camel (Dec 1918–Nov 1919)
 Sopwith Snipe (Apr 1924–Mar 1926)
 Hawker Woodcock (Mar 1926–Jan 1928)
 Gloster Gamecock (Jan 1928–Sep 1928)
 Armstrong Whitworth Siskin Mk.IIIa (Sep 1928–Oct 1929)
 Bristol Bulldog Mk.II (Oct 1929–Aug 1936)
 Bristol Bulldog Mk.IIa (Oct 1929–Aug 1936)
 Hawker Hart (Oct 1935–May 1936)
 Gloster Gauntlet Mk.II (Aug 1936–June 1939)
 Hawker Hurricane Mk.I (June 1939–Feb 1941)
 Hawker Hurricane Mk.IIa (Feb 1941–Apr 1941)
 Hawker Hurricane Mk.I (Apr 1941–Aug 1941)
 Hawker Hurricane Mk.IIb (July 1941–Nov 1941)
 Hawker Hurricane Mk.IIa (Jan 1942–June 1942)
 Hawker Hurricane Mk.IIb (June 1942–Aug 1942)
 Hawker Hurricane Mk.IIc (Aug 1942–June 1944)
 Supermarine Spitfire Mk.VIII (Mar 1944–June 1945)
 Supermarine Spitfire Mk.XIVe (June 1945–Feb 1948)
 Supermarine Spitfire LF.XVIe (Feb 1949–Mar 1951)
 Airspeed Oxford T.II (Feb 1949–Mar 1951)
 Miles Martinet TT.I (Feb 1949–Jan 1950)
 North American Harvard TT.IIb (Feb 1949–Mar 1951)
 Bristol Beaufighter TT.X (June 1949–Mar 1951)
 English Electric Canberra PR.7 (June 1956–Dec 1969)
 McDonnell Douglas Phantom FGR.2 (Sep 1970–Dec 1975)
 SEPECAT Jaguar GR.1 (Sep 1975–Mar 1985)
 Panavia Tornado GR.1 (Mar 1985–Mar 1999)
 Eurofighter Typhoon T.1 (Dec 2003–Apr 2013)
 Eurofighter Typhoon F.2 (Dec 2003–Apr 2013)
 Lockheed Martin F-35B Lightning (Apr 2013–)

See also
List of Royal Air Force aircraft squadrons

References

Sources
 Jefford, C.G. RAF Squadrons, a Comprehensive Record of the Movement and Equipment of all RAF Squadrons and their Antecedents since 1912. Shrewsbury, Shropshire, UK: Airlife Publishing, 1988 (second edition 2001). .

External links

RAF website: No. 17 Squadron

017
017 Squadron
RAF squadrons involved in the Battle of Britain
1915 establishments in the United Kingdom
Military units and formations of Ceylon in World War II
Military units and formations established in 1915
Military units and formations disestablished in 1919
Military units and formations established in 1924
Military units and formations disestablished in 1948
Military units and formations established in 1949
Military units and formations disestablished in 1951
Military units and formations established in 1956
Military units and formations disestablished in 1969
Military units and formations established in 1970
Military units and formations disestablished in 1999
Military units and formations established in 2002
Military units and formations disestablished in 2013
Military units and formations established in 2013
British Commonwealth Occupation Force
Military units and formations in California
United Kingdom–United States military relations
21st-century Royal Air Force deployments